Longeau is a village of Wallonia in the municipality and district of Messancy, located in the province of Luxembourg, Belgium.

Famous people related 
 Brian Molko, singer and cofounder of the rock band Placebo, spent a big part of his youth in Longeau.

References 

Populated places in Luxembourg (Belgium)
Messancy